

Seeds

Qualifiers

Draw

First qualifier

Second qualifier

Third qualifier

Fourth qualifier

References
1999 US Open – Women's draws and results at the International Tennis Federation

Women's Doubles Qualifying
US Open (tennis) by year – Qualifying